Posht Darb-e Olya (also Romanized as Posht Darb-e ‘Olyā; also known as Boneh-ye Rahmānī) is a village in Aghili-ye Shomali Rural District, Aghili District, Gotvand County, Khuzestan Province, Iran. At the 2006 census, its population was 285, in 44 families.

References 

Populated places in Gotvand County